Coolmine railway station serves Coolmine, County Dublin, Ireland.

It lies on the Dublin to Maynooth and Dublin Docklands to M3 Parkway railway station commuter routes.

A large car park is located next to the station, making it a popular park and ride location.

History

The station was opened on 2 July 1990, along with Broombridge, Castleknock, and Leixlip Confey. Like the latter three of these stations it underwent an upgrade project in 2000 which led to the portacabin booking office being replaced by a permanent station building and the platforms being lengthened. The ticket office is open from 06:30 to 13:00, Monday to Friday. It is closed on Saturday and Sunday.

See also 
 List of railway stations in Ireland
 Rail transport in Ireland

References

External links

 Irish Rail Coolmine Station Website

Iarnród Éireann stations in Fingal
Railway stations in Fingal
Railway stations opened in 1990
1990 establishments in Ireland
Castleknock
Railway stations in the Republic of Ireland opened in the 20th century